Aleksey Alekseevich Gubanov (12 March 1918 — 26 July 1982) was a Soviet fighter pilot during World War II. Awarded the title Hero of the Soviet Union on 24 August 1943 for his initial victories, by the end of the war his tally reached an estimated 23 solo and six shared shootdowns.

References 

1918 births
1982 deaths
Soviet World War II flying aces
Heroes of the Soviet Union
Recipients of the Order of Lenin
Recipients of the Order of the Red Banner
Recipients of the Order of Alexander Nevsky
Recipients of the Order of the Red Star